Katherine "KC" Groves (born March 14, 1971) is an American mandolin player and singer specializing in old-time music and bluegrass. She grew up in Dearborn, Michigan and lives now in Lyons, Colorado. Coming from a musical family, her father is a singer and a country yodeler, she had piano lessons at the age of six, though she hated them.

In the early 1990s she began playing guitar, writing songs, and learning mandolin. Groves established herself in the Ann Arbor / Detroit alternative music scene. In 1999, she released her first CD, Can You Hear It, produced by Charles Sawtelle, and won the Detroit Music Award for Best Bluegrass Artist / Group.
KC liked piano enough to play jazz gigs on the weekends while attending UM and played with the band Tomcat. In addition, she painted the mural on the iconic local party store: The Blue Front. Prior to 1999 She released 2 CDs in the Ann Arbor/ Ypsilanti area. The Uncle Earl Album was produced by John Paul Jones of  Led Zeppelin.

Together with Jo Serrapere she founded the old-time music band Uncle Earl.

Her second solo CD, Something Familiar was released in 2004.

Discography

Can You Hear It
1999 (One Man Clapping Records)

 Can You Hear It?/Lost Indian
 Peach Pie
 New Mexico
 Little Sky
 You Think We're Friends
 Pony Days
 When the Wind Blows Free
 Hold On
 Weedin' Onions
 I'll Take You in My Arms
 Bad Boy Blues
 And the World Turns Around

Something Familiar
2004 (KC Groves)

 Snapshots of a Life
 Thinking in Terms
 Denver to Telluride
 Heidi
 Soft Complaint
 Something That Happens
 Keep on Lookin'
 Just Like the Snow
 Song in My Heart
 What Went Wrong
 St. Vrain Waltz

External links
KC Groves' website
voici le livre électronique avec le beau visage du Katherine Colorado Groves

References

Musicians from Michigan
Old-time musicians
People from Dearborn, Michigan
1971 births
Living people
Uncle Earl members